Drive: The Surprising Truth About What Motivates Us is a non-fiction book written by Daniel Pink. The book was published in 2009 by Riverhead Hardcover. It argues that human motivation is largely intrinsic and that the aspects of this motivation can be divided into autonomy, mastery, and purpose. He argues against old models of motivation driven by rewards and fear of punishment, dominated by extrinsic factors such as money.

Summary 
Based on studies done at MIT and other universities, higher pay and bonuses result in better performance within the workplace only if tasks consist of basic mechanical skills. They found that this was true when it comes to problems with a defined set of steps and a single answer. If the task involved cognitive skills, decision-making, creativity, or higher-order thinking, higher pay resulted in lower performance. Supervisors should pay employees enough so they are not struggling to meet their basic needs and to ensure they feel that they are being paid fairly. If you do not pay employees adequately they will not be motivated. Pink suggests, "You should pay enough to take the issue of money off the table".

To motivate employees who work beyond basic tasks, Pink believes that supporting employees in the following areas will result in increased performance and satisfaction:
 Autonomy – A desire to be self directed, it increases engagement over compliance.
 Mastery – The urge to get better skilled.
 Purpose – The desire to do something that has meaning and is important. Businesses that only focus on profits without valuing purpose will end up with poor customer service and unhappy employees.

References

External links
 Official website
 Large Stakes and Big Mistakes, a study cited in the book
 
 

2009 non-fiction books
Motivation
Business books
Psychology books
Penguin Books books